This is the discography for The Afghan Whigs.

Albums

Studio albums

Compilation albums

Extended plays

Singles

Compilation appearances

Music videos

References

Discographies of American artists
Rock music group discographies